is a city located in Gifu, Japan. , the city had an estimated population of 56,972 and a population density of 74.81 persons per km2, in 22,508 households.

Geography
Minokamo is located in south-central Gifu Prefecture in the Nōbi Plain, between the Hida Mountains and the Kiso River.

Neighbouring municipalities
Gifu Prefecture
Seki
Kani
Mitake
Hichisō
Sakahogi
Tomika
Kawabe
Yaotsu

Climate
The city has a climate characterized by hot and humid summers, and mild winters (Köppen climate classification Cfa).

Demographics
Per Japanese census data, the population of Minokamo has grown substantially over the past 50 years. Notably, the proportion of foreign nationals residing in the city is very high for Japan, at 9.2% as of October 2020. The foreign residents are predominantly from Brazil or the Philippines, with small but growing Chinese and Vietnamese populations.

History
The area around Minokamo was part of traditional Mino Province. In the Edo period, the area was divided between the holdings of Owari Domain and Naegi Domain, and tenryō holdings directly under the Tokugawa shogunate. Ōta-juku flourished as a post station on the Nakasendō highway connecting Edo with Kyoto.  In the post-Meiji restoration cadastral reforms, Kamo District in Gifu prefecture was created. The modern city was formed on April 1, 1954 by the merger of the towns of Ota and Furui with the villages of Yamanoue, Hachiya, Kamono, Ibuka, Shimoyoneda and Miwa.

Government
Minokamo has a mayor-council form of government with a directly elected mayor and a unicameral city legislature of 16 members.

Economy
The area around Minokamo was formerly known for sericulture. Agriculture, including horticulture remains an important component of the local economy, producing crops such as rice, Asian pears, and persimmons. However, since the 1960s, the area has become increasingly industrialized as part of the Chubu Plateau Industrial Zone. Industries include textiles, semiconductor, electronics, machine tools and automotive components, as well as food products.

Education

Tertiary Education
 Shogen Junior College, a traditional Japanese arts and Buddhist scripture university run by the Shogenji Temple.

, a Gifu prefecture-run vocational school that offers associates degrees in industrial technology, and construction, and vocational certificates in residential construction, automobile engineering, and public facilities.

Primary and Secondary Schools
Minokamo has nine public elementary schools, and two public junior high schools operated by the city government, a junior high school operated by an association between Minokamo City and the neighbouring Tomika Town, and a private combined junior/senior high school, . The city has two public high schools operated by the Gifu Prefectural Board of Education, which also operates a special education school.

Transportation

Railway
 - JR Central - Takayama Main Line
  - 
 - JR Central - Taita Line
 - 
 Nagaragawa Railway Etsumi-Nan Line 
  -  -

Bus 

 The Odakyu Bus "Papillon" overnight bus connection to Shibuya (Tokyo)
 the Ai Ai Community Bus

Highway
 Tōkai-Kanjō Expressway

Twin towns – sister cities

Minokamo is twinned with:
 Dubbo, Australia

Local attractions
 Shōgen-ji, a Buddhist monastery
The Ota-juku area, a post town on the Nakasendo
River Port Park Minokamo, a park with river sports activities
Gifu-Seiryu Satoyama Park, a prefectural park with outdoor activities
Yamazaki Mazak Machine Tools Museum
Koyama Kannon Temple
Kobi no Tengusan, the main shrine of the

Seasonal Festivals 

 Summer Onsai Festival (on the first weekend of August)
 Autumn Onsai Festival (in October)
 Minokamo Citizens' Festival (in November)

Notable people from Minokamo
Tsubouchi Shōyō, author

References

External links 

  
 

 
Cities in Gifu Prefecture